Eclectric is the third album by Psy'Aviah released by Alfa Matrix. A 2-disc limited edition was also made available under the title Eclectricism.

Reviews

The German Sonic Seducer magazine noted a soft melancholy in some songs and lauded the album's diversity "beyond trodden paths of EBM". Side-Line called it "remarkably crafted" and also marked the diversity of influences. The Belgian Mindview magazine compared Emélie Nicolaï's singing to Anne Clark. Softsynth music blog declared it their best pick so far for 2010. Australian electronic music magazine Cyclic Defrost compared vocalist Emélie Nicolaï to Stieg Larsson's fictional character Lisbeth Salander for her attitude and looks.

Track listing
"No Excuse" - 04:34
"Keep Hope Alive" - 03:46
"!AllAboutYou" - 03:33
"Something Evil" - 04:31
"Anger Management" - 04:32
"Attract/Reject" - 04:06
"Paranoid" - 04:45
"Blackhole" - 05:16
"Ophélie (feat. Jean-Luc De Meyer)" - 04:05
"Sweet Hard Revenge" - 04:57
"Into The Game (feat. Ayria)" - 03:31
"Twisted Mind" - 03:57
"Fear (theory)" - 02:31
"Fear (practice)" - 04:50
"Rivotril Nights" - 03:12

Personnel
Yves Schelpe – keyboards, vocals, producer, programming, vocal arrangement, sound engineering, mixing
Emélie Nicolaï – vocals, vocal arrangement, art direction, design, photography, collages
Kristof De Clerck – guitar (tracks 4, 5, 6)
Geert de Wilde - sound engineering, mastering

References

Psy'Aviah albums
2010 albums
Alfa Matrix albums